Club Voleibol Logroño is a professional Volleyball team based in Logroño, La Rioja, Spain. It plays in Superliga Femenina.

Achievements
 2020 Copa de la Reina winners
 2019 Supercopa winners
 2018–19 Superliga Femenina winners
 2019 Copa de la Reina winners
 2018 Supercopa winners
 2017–18 Superliga Femenina winners
 2018 Copa de la Reina winners
 2017 Supercopa winners
 2016–17 Superliga Femenina winners
 2015–16 Superliga Femenina winners
 2016 Copa de la Reina winners
 2015 Supercopa winners
 2014–15 Superliga Femenina winners
 2015 Copa de la Reina winners
 2014 Supercopa winners
 2013–14 Superliga Femenina winners
 2014 Copa de la Reina winners
 2013 Supercopa winners
 2012–2013 Superliga Femenina runners-up
 2009–2010 Winner of Copa Princesa
 2009–2010 Spanish Superliga 2: 3rd. Place
 2008–2009 Liga FEV: 2nd. Place
 2007–2008 Spanish Second Division: 1st. Place

Season to season

References

External links 
 
RFEVB profile
Facebook profile

Sport in Logroño
Spanish volleyball clubs
Volleyball clubs established in 2004
Sports teams in La Rioja (Spain)